HD 194244 is a variable Be star in the equatorial constellation of Aquila. With an apparent magnitude of 6.14, according to the Bortle scale it is faintly visible to the naked eye from rural skies on a dark night.

References

External links
 HR 7803
 Image HD 194244

Aquila (constellation)
194244
B-type main-sequence stars
Be stars
7803
100664
Durchmusterung objects